The 2004 congressional elections in Arizona were elections for Arizona's delegation to the United States House of Representatives, which occurred along with congressional elections nationwide on November 2, 2004. Arizona has eight seats, as apportioned during the 2000 United States Census.  Republicans held six of the eight seats and Democrats held two. This would be the last time until 2022 that Republicans would win 6 House seats in Arizona.

Overview

Results

District 1

District 2

District 3

District 4

District 5

District 6

District 7

District 8

References

2004 Arizona elections
2004
Arizona